William Cumback (March 24, 1829 – July 31, 1905) was an American lawyer and  Civil War veteran who served one term as a U.S. Representative from Indiana from 1855 to 1857.

Biography 
Born near Mount Carmel, Indiana, Cumback attended the common schools and was graduated from Miami University, Oxford, Ohio.
He taught school two years.
He studied law at the Cincinnati Law School.
He was admitted to the bar and commenced practice in Greensburg, Indiana, in 1853.

Congress 
Cumback was elected as an Indiana People's Party candidate to the Thirty-fourth Congress (March 4, 1855 – March 3, 1857).
He was an unsuccessful candidate for reelection in 1856.

He resumed the practice of law.

Civil War 
He was appointed a paymaster in the Army and served throughout the Civil War.
He served as member of the State senate in 1866.
The 16th Lieutenant Governor of Indiana in 1868.

Later career and death 
He was an unsuccessful candidate for election to the United States Senate in 1869. 

President U.S. Grant nominated Cumback as the U.S. Minister to Portugal in 1870 but he declined the appointment.
He served as a United States revenue collector from 1871 to 1883.
He also served as a trustee of DePauw University in Greencastle, Indiana.

He was an unsuccessful candidate for nomination for governor in 1896.

He died in Greensburg, Indiana, July 31, 1905.
He was interred in South Park Cemetery.

Legacy 
William Cumback is the namesake of the community of Cumback, Indiana.

Notes and references

1829 births
1905 deaths
People from Franklin County, Indiana
Indiana Whigs
Opposition Party members of the United States House of Representatives from Indiana
Lieutenant Governors of Indiana
Indiana state senators
People of Indiana in the American Civil War
United States Army paymasters
People from Greensburg, Indiana
Miami University alumni
DePauw University people
19th-century American politicians
Members of the United States House of Representatives from Indiana
University of Cincinnati College of Law alumni
Indiana lawyers